"Sitting at the Wheel" is a 1983 hit single by The Moody Blues, written by John Lodge.  It was released in the US as the lead-off single from The Present in August 1983 and debuted on the Billboard Hot 100 on September 3, 1983.  In the UK, "Sitting at the Wheel" was released in November 1983 as the second single from The Present, following "Blue World".

Cash Box said "Sitting at the Wheel" was worth the long wait since the Moody Blues' previous US single, "The Voice," and that "bright, brassy keyboard flourishes give ELO-style orchestration and pumping bass rhythms a strong forward thrust."

"Sitting at the Wheel" peaked at #27 on the Billboard Hot 100 and #3 on the Billboard Mainstream Rock chart.  It peaked at #91 in the UK.

Personnel
Justin Hayward – vocals, guitar
John Lodge – vocals, bass guitar
Graeme Edge – drums
Patrick Moraz – keyboards

References

1983 singles
The Moody Blues songs
Songs written by John Lodge (musician)
1983 songs
Song recordings produced by Pip Williams